Huxley was a multiplayer first-person shooter computer game with persistent player characters published by Webzen Games Inc. It was being developed for Microsoft Windows. An Xbox 360 port was planned, but it has been put on an indefinite hold. Huxley initially was going to be cross platform, but according to statements made at the 2009 E3 Expo press conference that feature is currently excluded from development. The contract to operate the game in China was sold to The9 for $35 million USD on February 12, 2007, considered the largest export transaction to date for a Korean-developed game.

A trailer for the game was released in 2007 as a special DVD used to demonstrate LG LCD TVs.

In June 2009 NHN USA released the first English Closed Beta Test via its free games portal ijji.com. The initial test had a small number of users and was carried out over a space of two weeks. Keys for the test were made available through ijji (Globally) and FilePlanet (USA and Canada).

The second Closed Beta Test was initiated in late-July 2009 and lasted until August 12. The second test allowed many more players to test the game. During the last two days of the test a high-volume stress test was carried out on to the servers where everyone with an ijji account was permitted to play the game during test hours.

In April 2010 Huxley was integrated with Hangame game portal and went into open beta on May 3.

In August 2010 an official message was posted on the North American Huxley forums at IJJI. Huxley for the North American region will now be self hosted by Webzen.

On December 30, 2010, the Korean service for Huxley was discontinued.

Plot
In the near future, Nuclearites bombarded the world. Destructive earthquakes, massive tsunami and dramatic climate changes wreak havoc around the globe, isolating continents and driving the human race into chaos. Those who survive the destruction dream of tranquillity, but an eruption among the human race and the appearance of horrible mutants drives the world into further disorder. Racism and oppression cause rebellious uprisings and war that divide the landscape between two powers: Sapiens and Alternative. At the heart of the war emerges a powerful energy source called the Lunarites. The Lunarites were created by Huxley, a scientist and possible saviour.

Both factions seek glory and victory, fighting mercilessly for the Lunarites and their very existence.

The story was thought to be based on the novel Brave New World by Aldous Huxley, hence the name, however Webzen has stated there are no tie-ins to the book's story saying it was just an inspiration.

The game's visual style is reminiscent of the StarCraft series of games, which are extremely popular in South Korea (where the developer is based).

Gameplay

The speed and style of Huxley is fast-paced and team oriented, combining gameplay from twitch shooters such as Unreal Tournament with the character advancement and large worlds seen in MMORPG's like World of Warcraft. In a recent interview, Huxley's main producer  Kijong Kang said that the cities in Huxley will be able to accommodate up to 5,000 (according to recent publications that number was increased to 10,000 since summer 2006) people, and the individual battles will support over a hundred players. However, due to major changes in the game's engine and budget, the number of battling players has been reduced to 64 players (32 against 32) at the most. This number may or may not increase once the game is released.

There are two main types of Player versus Player battles. These are called Skirmishes and Battlefields. The skirmishes are small battles between two teams of 8 players on small to medium-sized maps. One player acts as the host player and can choose between a variety of settings and gametypes. The other players in the game then connect to the host and are separated into teams based on their character's faction. Battlefields are much larger scale battles with higher stakes and more players. In the Open Frontier Test of Huxley, this mode supported 64 players, 32 of each faction. Battlefields generally take place on much larger maps, and have objectives that players need to capture, retrieve, gather, or defend. Because hosting 64 players on a player's PC would be incredibly difficult, the Battlefields are hosted by dedicated servers.

In the Player versus Environment portion of Huxley, players can either play alone or group up with three others to kill AI-controlled monsters and complete quests. All fighting takes place in instance dungeons. There is also a town where players can meet up to talk, trade, shop, and form parties.

Leveling and experience
In the early part of the character advancement player system, players can shape their character in the style they like best. After that, players can then add depth to their characters. ‘Experiences’ and ‘Battle points’ are two elements of character advancement. ‘Experiences’ will affect the earlier part of character development and ‘Battle Points’ will affect the later part of a character’s development in a big way.

In the earlier part, by acquiring licenses, characters can have opportunities to use upgraded weapons and armor. In the later part of the game, players will concentrate on developing their characters to be more effective under any circumstance. One developer has stated, "We are planning to make the earlier part of character development relatively fast and the later part of development a bit slower but more abundant. This is because we decided that too much difference between characters abilities that affect combat result is not good for an FPS game."

Webzen has considered the fact that in most MMOGs the players at earlier levels have no chance of defeating those at the higher levels, and therefore they have adjusted the game to make skill more significant than long periods of playing the game and leveling up. Leveling up will give players advantages, such as more slots for upgrades and perhaps faster aiming, but a lower level player can still measure up to a higher one.

Vehicles
Huxley includes vehicles for both player-vs-player and player-vs-environment gameplay, as well as general transportation. Gameplay footage has shown several visually interesting SciFi vehicles, including an APC, an aircraft resembling Unreal Tournament 2004'''s Raptor, a large energy based tank, and a small assault buggy. Vehicles are used in both combat and transportation.

Developer interviews have also stated that players can obtain motorcycles for personal transportation, and that they will mainly serve as status symbols for wealthy players and as a quicker mean of transportation through town.

WeaponsHuxley has nine different types of weapons. Each class specializes in three weapons, and also has the option of using four weapons of the other classes, although with less proficiency.

There are also several different modifications of each type of weapon. These usually have minor tradeoffs like doing more damage with a lower fire rate, or being more accurate with less damage.

Some special weapon types start to appear for higher level classes. Notable ones of these are a splitting rocket launcher in which the rocket splits into two after a distance and an optical rifle which does a damage over time or slows the enemy. For the Enforcer they get special Flingers which have a longer distance of fire and will either stick to the wall or be able to be bounced off the wall. The Phantom gets Sniper rifles which have a chance to cause a devastating damage over time.

Abilities
Abilities, or skills, can be used in battle to give a player to a tactical advantage. As a player levels up, they are rewarded with new and more powerful skills. The type of skills available to the player differs based on their class. Skills are used by being "equipped" to armour. The number of skills that can be equipped depends on the players level and the rank of the armour. This system is very similar in concept to Call of Duty 4's perk system.

There are two types of skills, active and passive. Passive skills are skills that act as buffs, or skills that activate automatically when a certain condition is met, examples of this include health regeneration, and the ability to drop a flash grenade when low on health. Active skills are activated manually by hitting the assigned key.

Hosting
In June 2008, NHN USA announced that it had secured the rights to distribute Huxley via its ijji portal.Webzen and NHN USA executes Huxley licensing agreement for North America and Europe 

In August 2010, NHN USA announced that they will be transferring the publishing duties of Huxley: The Dystopia to developer Webzen.Huxley Official Statement.  posted in section Announcements of ijji.com forums, August 27, 2010. Retrieved August 29, 2010.

 Soundtrack 

The soundtrack for Huxley'' was composed by Kevin Riepl. The score was recorded by the 80-piece Hollywood Studio Symphony at Warner Bros in March 2007.

Track listing

See also
MMOFPS

References

External links
Official Korean Website

2010 video games
First-person shooters
Massively multiplayer online first-person shooter games
Ijji
Unreal Engine games
Video games developed in South Korea
Windows games
Windows-only games
Products and services discontinued in 2010
Inactive massively multiplayer online games
Webzen games
The9 games